The year 2006 is the sixth year in the history of Deep, a mixed martial arts promotion based in Japan. In 2006 Deep held 13 events beginning with, Deep: 23 Impact.

Title fights

Events list

Deep: 23 Impact

Deep: 23 Impact was an event held on February 5, 2006 at Korakuen Hall in Tokyo.

Results

Deep: 24 Impact

Deep: 24 Impact was an event held on April 11, 2006 at Korakuen Hall in Tokyo.

Results

Deep: clubDeep Nagoya: MB3z Impact, Di Entrare

Deep: clubDeep Nagoya: MB3z Impact, Di Entrare was an event held on May 21, 2006 at Zepp Nagoya in Nagoya.

Results

Deep: CMA Festival

Deep: CMA Festival was an event held on May 24, 2006 at Korakuen Hall in Tokyo.

Results

Deep: clubDeep Hiroshima: Monster Challenger

Deep: clubDeep Hiroshima: Monster Challenger was an event held on May 27, 2006 at the Saekiku Sports Center Subarena in Hiroshima.

Results

Deep: clubDeep Toyama: Barbarian Festival 4

Deep: clubDeep Toyama: Barbarian Festival 4 was an event held on June 18, 2006 at Toyama Event Plaza in Toyama.

Results

Deep: clubDeep Tokyo

Deep: clubDeep Tokyo was an event held on July 8, 2006 at Shinjuku Face in Tokyo.

Results

Deep: 25 Impact

Deep: 25 Impact was an event held on August 4, 2006 at Korakuen Hall in Tokyo.

Results

Deep: clubDeep Hakuba: Monster Challenge 2

Deep: clubDeep Hakuba: Monster Challenge 2 was an event held on August 12, 2006 at Hakuba47 Mountain Sports Park in Hakuba.

Results

Deep: 26 Impact

Deep: 26 Impact was an event held on October 10, 2006 at Korakuen Hall in Tokyo.

Results

Deep: clubDeep Toyama: Barbarian Festival 5

Deep: clubDeep Toyama: Barbarian Festival 5 was an event held on November 19, 2006 at Toyama Event Plaza in Toyama.

Results

Deep: clubDeep Tokyo: Future King Tournament 2006

Deep: clubDeep Tokyo: Future King Tournament 2006 was an event held on December 9, 2006 at Shinjuku Face in Tokyo.

Results

Deep: 27 Impact

Deep: 27 Impact was an event held on December 20, 2006 at Korakuen Hall in Tokyo.

Results

See also 
 List of Deep champions
 List of Deep events

References

Deep (mixed martial arts) events
2006 in mixed martial arts